"Forever Love" is the debut solo single released by British singer-songwriter Gary Barlow, taken from his debut solo album, Open Road (1997). It debuted at number one on the UK Singles Chart on 14 July 1996, becoming Barlow's first of three number-one singles away from Take That. Worldwide, "Forever Love" also topped the charts in Lithuania, Spain and Taiwan, while reaching the top five in Belgium, Denmark, Germany, Ireland and Switzerland. The song was used as the official theme for the film The Leading Man (1996).

Critical reception
British magazine Music Week rated the song four out of five, writing, "Barlow's undisputed writing skills are evident on this wistful ballad which builds to a dramatic climax. A surefire number one." Editor Alan Jones added, "An introspective ballad, it starts slowly and becomes increasingly urgent and compelling. Aside from Barlow's voice, which is in fine fettle, the song is dominated by piano and is a romantic tour-de-force of the kind his fans must have been hoping for. One of the year's biggest hits."

Chart performance
The song entered the UK Singles Chart at number one where it stayed for one week, before being dethroned by the Spice Girls' debut hit "Wannabe", thus making Barlow the first member of Take That to top the charts with a solo record. It remained in the top 75 for a total of 16 weeks, being certified Gold by the British Phonographic Industry.

Music video
The official music video of "Forever Love" is shot in black and white and begins with Gary Barlow waking up alone and looking out of a window which critics believe symbolises the start of a new chapter in Barlow's career. He is then shown to partake in a number of day-to-day activities and finally ends up in a downtown cafe where he witnesses all types of love that exist between people before returning to his studio.

Track listing
All tracks were written by Gary Barlow.

Standard
 "Forever Love" – 4:36
 "I Miss It All" – 4:02
 "Forever Love" (instrumental) – 4:37

Credits and personnel
Credits are lifted from the UK CD single liner notes and the Open Road album booklet.

Studio
 Recorded and mixed at Metropolis Studios (London, England)

Personnel

 Gary Barlow – writer, piano, production
 Chris Porter – production
 Chris Cameron – piano, bass, strings
 Andy Duncan – drums, percussion

 Steve McNichol – programming
 Rob Cattermole – programming assistant
 Stylorouge – artwork design
 Norman Watson – artwork photography

Charts and certifications

Weekly charts

Year-end charts

Certifications

References

1996 debut singles
1996 songs
Bertelsmann Music Group singles
Black-and-white music videos
Gary Barlow songs
Number-one singles in Spain
RCA Records singles
Songs written by Gary Barlow
Songs written by Nik Kershaw
UK Singles Chart number-one singles